Drum Tower or drum tower  may refer to:

 Drum tower (Asia), a tower in the center of an old Chinese city, or gulou
 Drum tower (Chinese Buddhism), a drum tower in a Chinese Buddhist temple
 Drum tower (Europe), a shape of tower on some European castles
 Drum Tower (Bangkok), a historic tower in Bangkok

See also
Gulou (disambiguation)